The 2019 Sacramento Republic FC season was the club's sixth season of existence. The club is playing in the USL Championship, the second tier of the American soccer pyramid. Sacramento Republic FC competed in the Western Conference of the USL Championship.

Background

Club

Roster

Staff

Competitions

Preseason

USL Championship

Results summary

Standings

Match results

On December 19, 2018, the USL announced that their 2019 season schedule.

Unless otherwise noted, all times in PDT (UTC-06)

USL Cup Playoffs

U.S. Open Cup

As a member of the USL Championship, Sacramento will entered the tournament in the Second Round, with the pairing announced on April 17.

References

Sacramento Republic FC seasons
Sacramento Republic FC
Sacramento Republic FC
Sacramento Republic FC